The 14853 / 54 / 63 / 64 / 65 / 66 Jodhpur–Varanasi Junction Marudhar Express is an Express train belonging to Indian Railways – North Western Railway zone that runs between  &  in India.

It operates as train number 14854 / 64 / 66 from Jodhpur Junction to Varanasi Junction and as train number 14853 / 63 / 65 in the reverse direction, serving the states of Uttar Pradesh & Rajasthan. It is the fastest train between Jaipur and Lucknow and one of the most important train of NWR.

The word Marudhar translates as Master of Air.

Coaches

The 14853 / 54 / 63 / 64 / 65 / 66 Jodhpur–Varanasi Junction Marudhar Express has 2 AC 2 tier, 3 AC 3 tier, 12 Sleeper class, 4 General Unreserved & 2 SLR (Seating cum Luggage Rake) coaches hence total 23 coaches. It does not carry a pantry car.
 
As is customary with most train services in India, coach composition may be amended at the discretion of Indian Railways depending on demand.

Service

As the average speed of the train is below , as per Indian Railways rules, its fare does not include a Superfast surcharge.

Routeing

Traction

The entire route is yet to be fully electrified.

 14854 / 53 / 66 / 65 Jodhpur–Varanasi Junction Marudhar Express via  &  – a Bhagat Ki Kothi-based WDP-4 locomotive hauls the train from  Jodhpur Junction up to  handing over to a Ghaziabad-based WAP-4 or WAP-7 locomotive until Lucknow NR following which a Lucknow-based WDM-3A locomotive powers the train for the remainder of the journey.
 14864 / 63 Jodhpur–Varanasi Junction Marudhar Express via Sultanpur – a Bhagat Ki Kothi-based WDP-4 locomotive hauls the train from  Jodhpur Junction up to  handing over to a Ghaziabad-based WAP-4 or WAP-7 locomotive which powers the train for the remainder of the journey.

Operation

 14854 Jodhpur–Varanasi Junction Marudhar Express via  leaves Jodhpur Junction every Monday, Thursday & Saturday and reaches Varanasi Junction the next day.
 14853 Varanasi Junction–Jodhpur Marudhar Express via  leaves Varanasi Junction every Monday, Wednesday & Saturday and reaches Jodhpur Junction the next day.
 14864 Jodhpur–Varanasi Junction Marudhar Express via Sultanpur leaves Jodhpur Junction every Tuesday, Friday & Sunday and reaches Varanasi Junction the next day.
 14863 Varanasi Junction–Jodhpur Marudhar Express via Sultanpur leaves Varanasi Junction every Tuesday, Friday & Sunday and reaches Jodhpur Junction the next day.
 14866 Jodhpur–Varanasi Junction Marudhar Express via  leaves Jodhpur Junction every Wednesday and reaches Varanasi Junction the next day.
 14865 Varanasi Junction–Jodhpur Marudhar Express via  leaves Varanasi Junction every Thursday and reaches Jodhpur Junction the next day.

See also 

 Varanasi Junction railway station
 Jodhpur Junction railway station
 Marudhar Express (via Pratapgarh)
 Marudhar Express (via Sultanpur)

References

External links

Passenger trains originating from Varanasi
Transport in Jodhpur
Named passenger trains of India
Rail transport in Rajasthan